Richard William Wills (born 5 December 1947) is an English bass guitarist. He is best known for his work with the rock band Foreigner and his associations with the Small Faces, Roxy Music, Peter Frampton, Spooky Tooth, David Gilmour, Bad Company and The Jones Gang.

Career
Rick Wills played in the early days of rock music in Cambridge, from c. 1961 in the Vikings, then in a succession of local bands: the Sundowners, Soul Committee, Bullitt (with David Gilmour on guitar and John 'Willie' Wilson on drums) and Cochise  before joining Frampton's Camel.

Wills joined the rock band Jokers Wild in mid-1966, (with David Gilmour on guitars and vocals), until they broke up in 1967.  He played bass on Peter Frampton's first three albums before parting from Frampton in 1975. He became the bassist with Roxy Music in 1976, before leaving them and joining the Small Faces in 1977, during their reunion period. He left the Small Faces and appeared on David Gilmour's eponymous album in 1978, with Willie Wilson on drums. The next year, Wills became a member of rock band Foreigner and remained with them for 14 years. At that time he was the longest-tenured bass player of Foreigner, though was later surpassed by Jeff Pilson.

After leaving Foreigner in 1992, he joined Bad Company and stayed with them until Boz Burrell rejoined the band in 1998. In July 1999 he filled in for Lynyrd Skynyrd bassist Leon Wilkeson for live shows when Wilkeson briefly took ill. He appeared at The Steve Marriott Memorial Concert on 24 April 2001, as part of a backing band with Bobby Tench, Zak Starkey and Rabbit Bundrick.

Wills was reunited with Small Faces drummer Kenney Jones in The Jones Gang during 2006, and appeared with the RD Crusaders for the Teenage Cancer Trust at The London International Music Show on 15 June 2008. Wills left The Jones Gang in the summer of 2015 and was replaced by Pat Davey.

On 12 January 2015, in Sarasota, Florida, Wills and original drummer Dennis Elliott joined Foreigner on stage to play "Headknocker".

On 28 October 2021, Wills joined the Mick Jones-less band for a three song encore at the Hampton Casono Ballroom in Hampton, NH.

Discography 

 Cochise 
 Cochise (1970) 
 Swallow Tales (1971)
 So Far (1972) 
 Past Loves (A History) (1992) - Compilation
 Velvet Mountain: An Anthology 1970-1972 (2013) - Compilation Double Album

With Peter Frampton
Wind of Change - A&M (1972)
Frampton's Camel – A&M (1973)
Somethin's Happening – A&M Records|A&M (1974)

With Roxy Music
Viva! – Atco (1976)

With Kevin Ayers 1976
Yes We Have No Mañanas (So Get Your Mañanas Today)

With The Small Faces
Playmates – Atlantic (1977)
78 in the Shade – Atlantic (1978)

With David Gilmour
David Gilmour – Harvest (1978)

With Foreigner
Head Games – Atlantic (1979)
4 – Atlantic (1981)
Agent Provocateur – Atlantic (1984)
Inside Information – Atlantic (1987)
Unusual Heat – Atlantic (1991)

With Bad Company
What You Hear Is What You Get: The Best of Bad Company – Atco (1993)
Company of Strangers – Elektra(1995)
Stories Told & Untold – Elektra (1997)

With The Jones Gang
Any Day Now - AAO Music (2005)

References

Further reading
The Rolling Stone Encyclopedia of Rock & Roll – 3rd Edition

External links

 

1947 births
Living people
British rock bass guitarists
Musicians from London
Foreigner (band) members
British rhythm and blues boom musicians
Small Faces members
Jokers Wild (band) members
Spooky Tooth members
Musicians from Cambridgeshire